Amygdalase may refer to one of two enzymes:
Beta-glucosidase
Amygdalin beta-glucosidase